Psilogramma dillerorum is a moth of the family Sphingidae. It is known from Pakistan.

References

Psilogramma
Moths described in 2001
Endemic fauna of Pakistan